Rodynske is a town in Pokrovsk Municipality, Donetsk Oblast (province) of Ukraine. Population: ; 11,996 (2001).

History 
Founded in 1950 according with the construction of coal mines. In 1962 it received the status of a city.

Demographics
Native language as of the Ukrainian Census of 2001:
Russian  75.9%
Ukrainian  23.2%
Armenian  0.3%
Belarusian  0.1%

Housing 
According to data from the city's statistical department, the housing stock is 250.0 thousand square meters of the total area. The large and small housing stock is located in the southern part of the city, which is served by the Municipal enterprise "Rodin Center of the single customer" established in 2007. 80% of the housing stock is in an emergency situation, the main problem is the repair of the roof. In the northern part of the city are built farms.

References

Cities in Donetsk Oblast
Populated places established in the Ukrainian Soviet Socialist Republic
Cities of district significance in Ukraine
Pokrovsk Raion